Miano  is a metro station under construction that will serve Line 1 on the Naples Metro.
Miano station, along with the Regina Margherita station and Secondigliano station, will serve the Secondigliano and Miano areas.

See also
Railway stations in Italy
List of Naples metro stations

Proposed Naples Metro stations
Railway stations in Italy opened in the 21st century